Colobothea bicuspidata is a species of beetle in the family Cerambycidae. It was described by Pierre André Latreille in 1811. It is known from Bolivia, Brazil, Colombia, Peru, Ecuador, and French Guiana.

References

bicuspidata
Beetles described in 1811
Beetles of South America